The 1992–93 CJAHL season was the 1st and only season of the OHA's Central Junior A Hockey League (CJAHL), a pilot project that would become the Ontario Provincial Junior A Hockey League in 1993. The nine teams of the East Division competed in a 48-game schedule, while the eight teams of the West Division played a 49-game schedule.  The top 7 teams of each division make the playoffs.

The winner of the CJAHL playoffs, the Barrie Colts, moved on to the OHA Junior B playoffs and won the Sutherland Cup.

Changes
Central Junior B Hockey League is elected to become pilot project for planned Junior A league.
Cobourg Cougars join CJAHL from COJCHL.
Aurora Eagles leave CJAHL for MetJHL.
Streetsville Derbys move and become Mississauga Derbys.

Final standings

Note: GP = Games played; W = Wins; L = Losses; OTL = Overtime losses; SL = Shootout losses; GF = Goals for; GA = Goals against; PTS = Points; x = clinched playoff berth; y = clinched division title; z = clinched conference title

1992-93 CJAHL Playoffs

Division Quarter-final
Burlington Cougars defeated Georgetown Raiders 3-games-to-none
Milton Merchants defeated Mississauga Derbys 3-games-to-none
Caledon Canadians defeated Oakville Blades 3-games-to-1
Markham Waxers defeated Ajax Axemen 3-games-to-1
Peterborough Jr. Petes defeated Lindsay Bears 3-games-to-2
Orillia Terriers defeated Newmarket 87's 3-games-to-2
Division Semi-final
Brampton Capitals defeated Caledon Canadians 4-games-to-1
Milton Merchants defeated Burlington Cougars 4-games-to-1
Barrie Colts defeated Orillia Terriers 4-games-to-1
Peterborough Jr. Petes defeated Markham Waxers 4-games-to-none
Division Final
Brampton Capitals defeated Milton Merchants 4-games-to-2
Barrie Colts defeated Peterborough Jr. Petes 4-games-to-1
Final
Barrie Colts defeated Brampton Capitals 4-games-to-none

OHA Sutherland Cup Junior B Championship
Semi-final
Barrie Colts defeated Hamilton Kilty B's (GHJHL) 4-games-to-none
Barrie 7 - Hamilton 2
Barrie 8 - Hamilton 3
Barrie 6 - Hamilton 5 2OT
Barrie 9 - Hamilton 5

Final
Barrie Colts defeated Kitchener Dutchmen (MWJHL) 4-games-to-none
Barrie 5 - Kitchener 2
Barrie 5 - Kitchener 3
Barrie 8 - Kitchener 5
Barrie 7 - Kitchener 3

Exhibition Series vs. MetJHL
The Barrie Colts of the Central League and the Wexford Raiders of the Metro Junior A Hockey League.  Played a pair of exhibition games head-to-head for charity.  The purpose of the games was to match the probably champions of the two leagues head-to-head to see where each league's talent level stood if the OHA was to allow both leagues in as sanctioned Junior A leagues for the 1993–94 season.  Wexford won both games by narrow margins, but the second game was marred by an incident involving a fight, initiated by the Barrie Colts, that spilled into the crowd.

Wexford Raiders (MetJHL) defeated Barrie Colts 7-6
Wexford Raiders (MetJHL) defeated Barrie Colts 4-3

See also
 Sutherland Cup
 List of OJHL seasons
 Western Ontario Hockey League
 Mid-Western Junior Hockey League
 Golden Horseshoe Junior Hockey League

References

External links
 Official website of the Ontario Junior Hockey League
 Official website of the Canadian Junior Hockey League

Ontario Junior Hockey League seasons
CJAHL